Ricardo González Gutiérrez known as Cepillín (February 7, 1946 – March 8, 2021) was a Mexican clown as well as a singer, TV host and actor.

Career
Ricardo was a dentist who started to paint his face so that kids would not be afraid of him as he worked on their teeth. He became famous when a local TV channel interviewed him. The name Cepillín means "Little (tooth)Brush" in Spanish (while "cepillo" means literally "brush", the origin of the nickname implies it is, in fact, referring to a toothbrush).

With Televisa he had a show called El Show de Cepillín starting in 1977. This was an educational, comedy and interview show with guests such as Lou Ferrigno (who was Hulk on the popular TV show). The show was a success in Mexico as well as Chile and Puerto Rico. He arguably became the most famous clown in Mexico and all Latin America. His show was aired in more than 18 countries.

Cepillín recorded 27 long play albums of children songs, 11 of which went gold. In all they sold more than 25 million copies worldwide. The most popular songs were La feria de Cepillín (Cepillín's Fair), Tomás ("Thomas"), En el bosque de la China ("In China's forest") and La Gallina Cocoua. Cepillín also helped younger artists to acquire fame such as singer Yuri, who took a role in his movie  ("Miracle in the circus"), and Salma Hayek, to whom he gave the opportunity in the masterpiece Aladdin as Jasmine.

Cepillín had another show in 1987 called Una sonrisa con Cepillín on Channel 5 of Televisa. 
	
In 1990 he returned to Monterrey for Súper sábados con Cepillín which featured his sons Ricardo González Jr (″Cepi″) and Roberto González (″Franky″). In 2006 he and his sons recorded Cepillín live for Multimedios Television. From 1982 to 2006 he toured Mexico and the United States with a circus that bore his name.

Political activism
On April 12, 2018, Cepillín uploaded a video where he endorsed Andrés Manuel López Obrador for president in the 2018 Mexican presidential election.

Health and death
González Gutiérrez was a smoker and was hospitalized with heart attacks on three occasions. 

Ricardo González Gutiérrez was admitted to a hospital in Naucalpan, State of Mexico, on February 28, 2021 because of intense back pain. He underwent a nine-hour surgery and seemed to be recovering, and received a visit from ″Rey Grupero″ (Luis Alberto Ordaz). However, he had chest pains and was admitted to intensive care and put on a ventillator on March 7. On March 8, 2021, Cepillín died at the age of 75 after battling spinal cancer. His son, Ricardo González Jr., said that his father had a respiratory arrest from which the doctors managed to "get him out of"; however, he reported that "he was already very deteriorated" and he had a failed kidney.

Films
1979: Milagro en el circo
1989: La Corneta de mi General
1989  Hola Ninos de lucion

Albums
2016: Gracias – Album nominated for the Latin Grammy 
1998: Cepillín 15 éxitos Vol. II 
1995: Fiesta con Cepillín 
1994: Cepillín 15 éxitos El Payasito de la Tele 
1991: Cepillín Fiesta con Cepillín
1981: Cepillín El Vaquero Infantil Pancho Lopez
1978: Fiebre Del Cepillín, Cepillín Night Fever
1978: Navidad Con Cepillín Vol. IV
1978: Cepillín Vamos a la escuela Vol. III
1978: Cepillín La Feria De Cepillín Vol. II
1977: Un Dia Con Mamá Vol. I

References

External links

Article on El Universal (in Spanish).
Cepillín died at the age of 75 due to Spine Surgery Complications

Mexican male film actors
Mexican clowns
People from Monterrey
1945 births
2021 deaths
Mexican television personalities
Deaths from spinal cancer
Deaths from cancer in Mexico
Neurological disease deaths in Mexico
Mexican dentists